Arwi Muslims are Tamil-speaking Muslims.

Arwi is an Arabic-influenced dialect of Tamil written with an extension of the Arabic alphabet.

See also 

 Thaika Shuaib

External links 

 Shu’ayb, Tayka. Arabic, Arwi and Persian in Sarandib and Tamil Nadu. Madras: Imāmul 'Arūs Trust, 1993
 Dr. K. M. A. Ahamed Zubair. ''The Rise and Decline of Arabu–Tamil Language for Tamil Muslims'' IIUC STUDIES, 2014
 Islam in Tamilnadu: Varia.  (PDF) Retrieved on 2012-06-27.

References 

Sri Lankan Moors